AACG may refer to:

 Acute angle closure glaucoma, see Glaucoma
 Australasian Association of Clinical Geneticists